The Matrimonial Causes Act 1864 is an act of the Parliament of the United Kingdom. The act reduced the powers of women deserted by their husbands to protect their property and income from him or any of his creditors. The act received Royal Assent on 14 July 1864.

Provisions
The provisions of the act include:
Allowing husbands who had deserted their wives or creditors of those husbands to apply to a court to have an Order that the wife had placed to protect her property or earnings from her husband and his creditors discharged.
Women had been granted the ability to protect their property and earnings from a husband that had deserted them or his creditors in the Matrimonial Causes Act 1857 by applying to a police magistrate, a Justice in the Petty Sessions or the Court for Divorce and Matrimonial Cases.

Timeline
The Act was revoked entirely by the Administration of Justice Act 1965.

References

United Kingdom Acts of Parliament 1864
Marriage law in the United Kingdom
1864 in British law